Gokanna, Gokaṇṇa, Gokana or Gokhana may refer to:

Trincomalee (in Pali: Gokaṇṇa), city in Sri Lanka
Gokana kingdom, also Gokhana, an Ogoni kingdom, now local government area, in Rivers State, Nigeria 
Gokana language, the eastern Ogoni language
Gokana, Nigeria, a Local Government Area

See also
 Gokhan